Ostapenko is a Ukrainian surname that is derived from the name Ostap. 

The surname may refer to:
 Aleksey Ostapenko (born 1986), Russian volleyball player
 Dmytro Ostapenko (born 1946), Ukrainian statesman
 Jeļena Ostapenko (born 1997), Latvian tennis player
 Oleg Ostapenko (born 1957), Russian colonel general
 Oleh Ostapenko Jr. (born 1997), Ukrainian footballer
 Oleh Ostapenko Sr. (born 1977), Ukrainian footballer and manager
 Sergei Ostapenko (born 1986), Kazakhstani footballer
 Serhiy Ostapenko (1881–1937), Ukrainian economist and statesman

See also
 

Ukrainian-language surnames